State Route 282 (SR 282), also known as Dunbar Road, is a  secondary state highway in Cumberland County, Tennessee, connecting SR 101 with Lake Tansi Village. SR 282 is the primary road, and only state highway, in and out of Lake Tansi Village.

Route description

SR 282 begins in Lake Tansi Village as a continuation of Dunbar Road, directly beside of Brown Elementary School. It goes north to pass through neighborhoods before passing by, and crossing, Lake Tansi. The highway then passes several businesses and a golf course before passing through more neighborhoods. SR 282 then leaves Lake Tansi Village and goes northeast through rural areas before coming to an end at an intersection with SR 101, just southwest of Crossville. SR 282 is a two-lane road for its entire length.

Major intersections

References

282
Transportation in Cumberland County, Tennessee